is a passenger railway station located in the city of Inabe, Mie Prefecture, Japan, operated by the private railway operator Sangi Railway.

Lines
Higashi-Fujiwara Station is a terminus by the Sangi Line, and is located 23.1 kilometres from the opposing terminus of the line at Kintetsu-Tomida Station.

Layout
The station consists of a single island platform connected to thewooden station building by a level crossing. A Hoki Type 5700 Hopper car is on display outside the station.

Platforms

Adjacent stations

History
Higashi-Fujiwara Station was opened on July 23, 1931.

Passenger statistics
In fiscal 2019, the station was used by an average of 39 passengers daily (boarding passengers only).

Surrounding area
Taiheiyo Cement Fujiwara Factory

See also
List of railway stations in Japan

References

External links

Sangi Railway official home page

Railway stations in Japan opened in 1931
Railway stations in Mie Prefecture
Inabe, Mie